Ronan O'Brien (born 1974, Dublin) is an Irish author, winner of the 2009 Irish Book Awards "Newcomer of the Year" for his first novel Confessions of a Fallen Angel.

He studied law at University College Dublin and then obtained a master's degree in modern drama studies. His primary career is as a solicitor specialising in criminal law. He lives in County Kildare with his wife Rita and is currently working on his second novel.

References

External links

Irish solicitors
People from County Dublin
Alumni of University College Dublin
1974 births
Living people
21st-century Irish novelists
Irish male novelists
21st-century Irish male writers